Straight to You – Triple J's Tribute to Nick Cave is a series of live concerts and subsequent compilation album and DVD of the concerts. It was designed as a tribute to the career of Nick Cave and consisted of various artist performing songs previously performed by Cave.

The Straight To You concerts was held during Triple J's "Aus Music Month". Performed over two acts it featured a variety of singers in front of a house band. The Backing band was led by Cameron Bruce. Singers participating include Abbe May, Adalita, Alex Burnett, Ben Corbett, Bertie Blackman, Dan Sultan, Jake Stone, Johnny Mackay, Kram, Lanie Lane, Lisa Mitchell, Muscles, Tim Rogers and Urthboy. There was 8 concerts held in seven cities from 9–20 November 2011.

The Sydney concert was broadcast nationally on ABC2 TV and Triple J.

A double CD of tracks from the concerts was released in February 2012 and won an ARIA Award for Best Original Soundtrack/Cast/Show Album. 

A DVD version of the concert was released in March with footage recorded at The Enmore, Sydney and the Forum, Melbourne.

Reception
The CD release peaked at #32 on ARIA's Album Chart and was met with positive reviews. Krystal Maynard wrote in Beat Magazine that it was "an ambitious project that serves up some tasty morsels right alongside some catch you’d rather throw back." Lisa Rockman of The Newcastle Herald finished her 4 1/2 star review stating it is "A worthy homage to one of Australia's most respected musicians." Sydney MX's Andrea Beattie gave it 4 stars stating "This live recorded tribute to ARIA Hall of Famer Nick Cave is a fitting one; a grandiose and darkly passionate re-imagining of some of Cave's most intense and well-known tracks by some of Australia's best musicians."

Accolades

Album track listing

Disc 1

Disc 2

DVD Track listing

DVD 1
 Red Right Hand - Kram
 Do You Love Me? - Bertie Blackman And Muscles
 Where The Wild Roses Grow - Alex Burnett And Lanie Lane
 Shivers - Alex Burnett
 Nick The Stripper - Johnny Mackay
 The Ship Song - Lisa Mitchell
 Deanna - Dan Sultan
 Lie Down Here (& Be My Girl) - Abbe May
 Nobody's Baby Now - Paul Kelly
 There Is A Kingdom - Kram, Lisa Mitchell And Dan Sultan
 Straight To You - Adalita
 The Weeping Song - Jake Stone
 Into My Arms - Lisa Mitchell
 Stagger Lee - Urthboy
 The Mercy Seat - Bertie Blackman
 Henry Lee - Kram
 Jack The Ripper - Lanie Lane
 Get Ready For Love - Dan Sultan
 Papa Won't Leave You, Henry - Adalita

DVD 2 
 Rehearsal footage
 Interviews with Adalita, Lanie Lane, Bertie Blackman, Jake Stone, Urthboy, Alex Burnett, Kram and Lisa Mitchell
 O Children - Urthboy
 Lament - Paul Kelly And Adalita

References

Compilation albums by Australian artists
ARIA Award-winning albums